Kelvin Li (born 28 January 1975) is a Hong Kong freestyle swimmer. He competed in three events at the 1992 Summer Olympics.

References

External links
 

1975 births
Living people
Hong Kong male freestyle swimmers
Olympic swimmers of Hong Kong
Swimmers at the 1992 Summer Olympics
Place of birth missing (living people)